Darko Churlinov (born 11 July 2000) is a Macedonian professional footballer who plays as a winger for Championship club Burnley and the North Macedonia national team.

Club career
Churlinov was born and raised in Skopje, Republic of Macedonia, where he also started playing football with local FK Forca. Subsequently, he went through the youth ranks of FK Rabotnički and FK Vardar until he was 14 years old. Then he moved to Germany and joined the youth setup of Hansa Rostock, where his friend and fellow Macedonian footballer Dimitar Mitrovski was already playing in the youth teams. Mitrovski had asked the club officials to sign Churlinov as he would like to have a fellow Macedonian as teammate.

On 8 January 2020, Churlinov moved to VfB Stuttgart.

On 18 August 2021, he joined Schalke 04 on a loan deal until the end of the season.

On 19 August 2022, he joined Burnley on a four year deal.

International career
On 28 March 2017, at the age of 16 years and 8 months, Churlinov made his debut for the Macedonia national team in a friendly match against Belarus, and with it he became the youngest player who has ever played for Macedonia's national team.

Career statistics

Club

International

Scores and results list North Macedonia's goal tally first.

Honours
Schalke 04
2. Bundesliga: 2021–22

References

External links
 
 sport.de

2000 births
Living people
Footballers from Skopje
Association football midfielders
Macedonian footballers
North Macedonia youth international footballers
North Macedonia under-21 international footballers
North Macedonia international footballers
1. FC Köln II players
1. FC Köln players
VfB Stuttgart players
VfB Stuttgart II players
FC Schalke 04 players
Burnley F.C. players
Regionalliga players
Bundesliga players
2. Bundesliga players
English Football League players
UEFA Euro 2020 players
Macedonian expatriate footballers
Expatriate footballers in Germany
Macedonian expatriate sportspeople in Germany
Expatriate footballers in England
Macedonian expatriate sportspeople in England